Opened in 1925, Meeth Halt was a small railway station on the North Devon and Cornwall Junction Light Railway, a private line until it became part of the Southern Region of British Railways in 1948. The line was built in part over a narrow gauge line that was used from 1881 to take ball clay from claypits at Marland and Meeth to Torrington, which was until 1925 the terminus of a branch from Barnstaple.

The line was closed to passenger traffic in 1965 as part of the Beeching proposals, but remained open for freight from the Meeth clay workings north of Meeth Halt through Torrington to Barnstaple until 1982. The station consisted of a simple short concrete platform and a stone shelter and remains as a recognisable landmark on the Tarka Trail, a very popular destination for long-distance walkers and cyclists. As a result it is in the process of a major renovation.

References

See also 
Old bus by ex-Halt
List of closed railway stations in Britain
List of former West Country Halts

Disused railway stations in Devon
Former Southern Railway (UK) stations
Railway stations in Great Britain opened in 1925
Railway stations in Great Britain closed in 1965
Beeching closures in England
1925 establishments in England
1965 disestablishments in England